The Chamber of Deputies is the lower house in Romania's bicameral parliament. It has 330 total seats to which deputies are elected by direct popular vote using party-list proportional representation to serve four-year terms. Additionally, the organisation of each national ethnic minority is entitled to a seat in the Chamber (under the limitation that a national minority is to be represented by one organisation only).

Leadership and structure

Standing Bureau 

The is the body elected by the deputies that rules the Chamber. Its president is the President of the Chamber, who is elected for a whole legislature (usually four years). All the other members are elected at the beginning of each parliamentary session.

There is one president, and four each of vice presidents, quaestors, and secretaries. The current composition is listed below.

Last President of Chamber Election: November 2021

Committees of the Chamber 
Standing committees and current leadership are listed below.

Party composition

2020–2024 

|- 
! style="text-align:center;" colspan=2 rowspan=2 | Party
! style="text-align:center;" colspan=2 | Election seating
! style="text-align:center;" rowspan=2 | Lost
! style="text-align:center;" rowspan=2 | Won
! style="text-align:center;" colspan=2 | Present seating
|-
! style="text-align:center;" | Seats
! style="text-align:center;" | %
! style="text-align:center;" | Seats
! style="text-align:center;" | %
|-
|  
| style="text-align:left;" | Social Democratic Party
| style="text-align:right;vertical-align:top;" | 110
| style="text-align:right;vertical-align:top;" | 33.33%
| style="text-align:right;vertical-align:top;" | 6
| style="text-align:right;vertical-align:top;" | 3
| style="text-align:right;vertical-align:top;" | 107
| style="text-align:right;vertical-align:top;" | 32.42%
|-
|  
| style="text-align:left;" | National Liberal Party
| style="text-align:right;vertical-align:top;" | 93
| style="text-align:right;vertical-align:top;" | 28.18%
| style="text-align:right;vertical-align:top;" | 16
| style="text-align:right;vertical-align:top;" | 4
| style="text-align:right;vertical-align:top;" | 81
| style="text-align:right;vertical-align:top;" | 24.54%
|-
| ! style="background-color: #00AAE7" | 
| style="text-align:left;" | Save Romania Union
| style="text-align:right;vertical-align:top;" | 55
| style="text-align:right;vertical-align:top;" | 16.66%
| style="text-align:right;vertical-align:top;" | 13
| style="text-align:right;vertical-align:top;" | 0
| style="text-align:right;vertical-align:top;" | 42
| style="text-align:right;vertical-align:top;" | 12.72%
|- 
| ! style="background-color: " | 
| style="text-align:left;" | Alliance for the Union of Romanians
| style="text-align:right;vertical-align:top;" | 33
| style="text-align:right;vertical-align:top;" | 10.00%
| style="text-align:right;vertical-align:top;" | 11
| style="text-align:right;vertical-align:top;" | 1
| style="text-align:right;vertical-align:top;" | 23
| style="text-align:right;vertical-align:top;" | 6.96%
|-
|  
| style="text-align:left;" | Democratic Alliance of Hungarians in Romania
| style="text-align:right;vertical-align:top;" | 21
| style="text-align:right;vertical-align:top;" | 6.36%
| style="text-align:right;vertical-align:top;" | 1
| style="text-align:right;vertical-align:top;" | 0
| style="text-align:right;vertical-align:top;" | 20
| style="text-align:right;vertical-align:top;" | 6.06%
|-
| ! style="background-color: #000000" | 
| style="text-align:left;" | Parties of ethnic minorities
| style="text-align:right;vertical-align:top;" | 18
| style="text-align:right;vertical-align:top;" | 5.45%
| style="text-align:right;vertical-align:top;" | 1
| style="text-align:right;vertical-align:top;" | 1
| style="text-align:right;vertical-align:top;" | 18
| style="text-align:right;vertical-align:top;" | 5.45%
|-
|  
| style="text-align:left;" | Force of the Right
| style="text-align:right;vertical-align:top;" | —
| style="text-align:right;vertical-align:top;" | —
| style="text-align:right;vertical-align:top;" | 1
| style="text-align:right;vertical-align:top;" | 17
| style="text-align:right;vertical-align:top;" | 16
| style="text-align:right;vertical-align:top;" | 4.84%
|-
| ! style="background-color: #c40075" | 
| style="text-align:left;" | Renewing Romania's European Project
| style="text-align:right;vertical-align:top;" | —
| style="text-align:right;vertical-align:top;" | —
| style="text-align:right;vertical-align:top;" | 0
| style="text-align:right;vertical-align:top;" | 9
| style="text-align:right;vertical-align:top;" | 9
| style="text-align:right;vertical-align:top;" | 2.72%
|-
| ! style="background-color: #0066B6" | 
| style="text-align:left;" | Social Liberal Humanist Party
| style="text-align:right;vertical-align:top;" | —
| style="text-align:right;vertical-align:top;" | —
| style="text-align:right;vertical-align:top;" | 0
| style="text-align:right;vertical-align:top;" | 4
| style="text-align:right;vertical-align:top;" | 4
| style="text-align:right;vertical-align:top;" | 1.21%
|- 
| ! style="background-color: " | 
| style="text-align:left;" | Romanian Nationhood Party
| style="text-align:right;vertical-align:top;" | —
| style="text-align:right;vertical-align:top;" | —
| style="text-align:right;vertical-align:top;" | 0
| style="text-align:right;vertical-align:top;" | 4
| style="text-align:right;vertical-align:top;" | 4
| style="text-align:right;vertical-align:top;" | 1.21%
|-
| ! style="background-color: " |
| style="text-align:left;" | The Right Alternative
| style="text-align:right;vertical-align:top;" | —
| style="text-align:right;vertical-align:top;" | —
| style="text-align:right;vertical-align:top;" | 0
| style="text-align:right;vertical-align:top;" | 3
| style="text-align:right;vertical-align:top;" | 3
| style="text-align:right;vertical-align:top;" | 0.90%
|-
| ! style="background-color: " | 
| style="text-align:left;" | Alliance for the Homeland
| style="text-align:right;vertical-align:top;" | —
| style="text-align:right;vertical-align:top;" | —
| style="text-align:right;vertical-align:top;" | 0
| style="text-align:right;vertical-align:top;" | 1
| style="text-align:right;vertical-align:top;" | 1
| style="text-align:right;vertical-align:top;" | 0.30%
|-
| ! style="background-color: " |
| style="text-align:left;" | Association of Italians of Romania
| style="text-align:right;vertical-align:top;" | —
| style="text-align:right;vertical-align:top;" | —
| style="text-align:right;vertical-align:top;" | 0
| style="text-align:right;vertical-align:top;" | 1
| style="text-align:right;vertical-align:top;" | 1
| style="text-align:right;vertical-align:top;" | 0.30%
|-
|  
| style="text-align:left;" | Independents
| style="text-align:right;vertical-align:top;" | —
| style="text-align:right;vertical-align:top;" | —
| style="text-align:right;vertical-align:top;" | 12
| style="text-align:right;vertical-align:top;" | 15
| style="text-align:right;vertical-align:top;" | 3
| style="text-align:right;vertical-align:top;" | 0.90%
|-
! align=left colspan=2|Total
! 330
! 100
! colspan=2 | —
! 330
! 100
|}

2016–2020 

|- 
! style="text-align:center;" colspan=2 rowspan=2 | Party
! style="text-align:center;" colspan=2 | Election seating
! style="text-align:center;" rowspan=2 | Lost
! style="text-align:center;" rowspan=2 | Won
! style="text-align:center;" colspan=2 | End seating
|-
! style="text-align:center;" | Seats
! style="text-align:center;" | %
! style="text-align:center;" | Seats
! style="text-align:center;" | %
|-
|  
| style="text-align:left;" | Social Democratic Party
| style="text-align:right;vertical-align:top;" | 154
| style="text-align:right;vertical-align:top;" | 46.8%
| style="text-align:right;vertical-align:top;" | 65
| style="text-align:right;vertical-align:top;" | 28
| style="text-align:right;vertical-align:top;" | 117
| style="text-align:right;vertical-align:top;" | 35.56%
|-
|  
| style="text-align:left;" | National Liberal Party
| style="text-align:right;vertical-align:top;" | 69
| style="text-align:right;vertical-align:top;" | 20.97%
| style="text-align:right;vertical-align:top;" | 6
| style="text-align:right;vertical-align:top;" | 3
| style="text-align:right;vertical-align:top;" | 66
| style="text-align:right;vertical-align:top;" | 20.06%
|-
|  
| style="text-align:left;" | Save Romania Union
| style="text-align:right;vertical-align:top;" | 30
| style="text-align:right;vertical-align:top;" | 9.11%
| style="text-align:right;vertical-align:top;" | 11
| style="text-align:right;vertical-align:top;" | 6
| style="text-align:right;vertical-align:top;" | 25
| style="text-align:right;vertical-align:top;" | 7.59%
|-
|  
| style="text-align:left;" | Democratic Alliance of Hungarians in Romania
| style="text-align:right;vertical-align:top;" | 21
| style="text-align:right;vertical-align:top;" | 6.38%
| style="text-align:right;vertical-align:top;" | 1
| style="text-align:right;vertical-align:top;" | 0
| style="text-align:right;vertical-align:top;" | 20
| style="text-align:right;vertical-align:top;" | 6.07%
|-
|  
| style="text-align:left;" | Alliance of Liberals and Democrats
| style="text-align:right;vertical-align:top;" | 20
| style="text-align:right;vertical-align:top;" | 6.07%
| style="text-align:right;vertical-align:top;" | 10
| style="text-align:right;vertical-align:top;" | 4
| style="text-align:right;vertical-align:top;" | 14
| style="text-align:right;vertical-align:top;" | 4.26%
|-
|  
| style="text-align:left;" | People's Movement Party
| style="text-align:right;vertical-align:top;" | 18
| style="text-align:right;vertical-align:top;" | 5.47%
| style="text-align:right;vertical-align:top;" | 9
| style="text-align:right;vertical-align:top;" | 6
| style="text-align:right;vertical-align:top;" | 15
| style="text-align:right;vertical-align:top;" | 4.55%
|-
| ! style="background-color: #000000" | 
| style="text-align:left;" | Parties of ethnic minorities
| style="text-align:right;vertical-align:top;" | 17
| style="text-align:right;vertical-align:top;" | 5.17%
| style="text-align:right;vertical-align:top;" | 0
| style="text-align:right;vertical-align:top;" | 0
| style="text-align:right;vertical-align:top;" | 17
| style="text-align:right;vertical-align:top;" | 5.17%
|-
| ! style="background-color:  | 
| style="text-align:left;" | PRO Romania
| style="text-align:right;vertical-align:top;" | —
| style="text-align:right;vertical-align:top;" | —
| style="text-align:right;vertical-align:top;" | 0
| style="text-align:right;vertical-align:top;" | 21
| style="text-align:right;vertical-align:top;" | 21
| style="text-align:right;vertical-align:top;" | 6.38%
|-
| ! style="background-color:  | 
| style="text-align:left;" | Humanist Power Party
| style="text-align:right;vertical-align:top;" | —
| style="text-align:right;vertical-align:top;" | —
| style="text-align:right;vertical-align:top;" | 0
| style="text-align:right;vertical-align:top;" | 7
| style="text-align:right;vertical-align:top;" | 7
| style="text-align:right;vertical-align:top;" | 2.12%
|-
|  
| style="text-align:left;" | Independents
| style="text-align:right;vertical-align:top;" | —
| style="text-align:right;vertical-align:top;" | —
| style="text-align:right;vertical-align:top;" | 11
| style="text-align:right;vertical-align:top;" | 38
| style="text-align:right;vertical-align:top;" | 27
| style="text-align:right;vertical-align:top;" | 10.94%
|-
! align=left colspan=2|Total
! 329
! 100
! colspan=2 | —
! 329
! 100
|}

2012–2016

2008–2012

2004–2008 

In Romania's 2004 legislative election, held on 28 November, no party won an outright majority. The Social Democratic Party (PSD) won the largest number of seats but is currently in opposition because the Justice and Truth Alliance (DA), the Democratic Alliance of Hungarians in Romania (UDMR/RMDSZ), the Romanian Humanist Party (which later became the Conservative Party), and the National Minorities formed a governing coalition, giving it 177 seats in the Chamber of Deputies (47.9% of the total). The Conservative Party (PC) withdrew in December 2006, meaning that the government lost the majority in the Chamber of Deputies. In April 2007, then national liberal Prime Minister, Călin Popescu-Tăriceanu, dismissed the Democratic Party ministers from the government and formed a minority government with the Democratic Alliance of Hungarians in Romania, marking the end of the Justice and Truth Alliance.

During the 2004–2008 legislature, the president of the Chamber of Deputies was Bogdan Olteanu from the National Liberal Party (PNL), who was elected on 20 March 2006, after the Chamber's former president, Adrian Năstase, was forced by his own party (the Social Democratic Party, PSD) to step down amidst corruption allegations.

After the 2004 elections, several deputies from the PSD switched to other parties (including the governing Justice and Truth Alliance) or became independents, with the total number of PSD seats being reduced from 113 to 105. The number of Justice and Truth Alliance (DA) deputies also increased from 112 to 118, making it the largest formation in parliament as of October 2006. This changed again in December 2006, leaving the PSD with 107 seats and the Justice and Truth Alliance (DA) with 101. Since April 2007 the Justice and Truth Alliance (DA) has split leaving the two former members with 51 respectively 50 members. Deputies elected to the European Parliament in the 2007 election resigned, thus reducing the number of deputies to 314 as of 4 December 2007.

A new election was held in 2008. The table below gives the state of play before the 2008 election; parties in bold were part of the governing coalition. That coalition was tacitly supported by the PSD.

2000–2004 

Elections to the Chamber of Deputies were held on 26 November 2000, in which the Social Democratic Party of Romania (PSD) won plurality. The governing majority was formed from the PSD and the Democratic Alliance of Hungarians in Romania (UDMR/RMDSZ), which, with 182 members, made up 54.8% of seats. The president of the Chamber of Deputies during this period was Valer Dorneanu, who was elected on 15 December 2000. The distribution of seats was as follows:

1996–2000

1992–1996

1990–1992

See also 

 President of the Chamber of Deputies of Romania

Notes

References

External links 
 

 
Romania
Parliament of Romania
1862 establishments in Romania